Alan Rhodes (born ) is a former professional rugby league footballer who played in the 1960s, 1970s and 1980s, and coached in the 1980s.

Background
Alan Rhodes was a pupil at Castleford Grammar School during the 1960s, he was in the same school year as the rugby league footballer; Roger Millward.

Playing career
Alan Rhodes signed for Featherstone Rovers on Thursday 30 November 1967, he made his début for Featherstone Rovers on Saturday 2 March 1968, he played his last match for Featherstone Rovers during the 1974–75 season, he made his début for York on Sunday 7 September 1975, and he played his last match for York on Sunday 20 April 1980, he appears to have scored no drop-goals (or field-goals as they are currently known in Australasia), but prior to the 1974–75 season all goals, whether; conversions, penalties, or drop-goals, scored 2-points, consequently prior to this date drop-goals were often not explicitly documented, therefore '0' drop-goals may indicate drop-goals not recorded, rather than no drop-goals scored.

Challenge Cup Final appearances
Alan Rhodes played left-, i.e. number 11, (replaced by interchange/substitute No. 15 Barry Hollis) in Featherstone Rovers' 33-14 victory over Bradford Northern in the 1973 Challenge Cup Final during the 1972–73 season at Wembley Stadium, London on Saturday 12 May 1973, in front of a crowd of 72,395, and played left- (replaced by interchange/substitute No. 14 David Busfield) in the 9-24 defeat by Warrington in the 1974 Challenge Cup Final during the 1973–74 season at Wembley Stadium, London on Saturday 11 May 1974, in front of a crowd of 77,400.

County Cup Final appearances
Alan Rhodes played left-, i.e. number 11, in Featherstone Rovers' 7-23 defeat by Leeds in the 1970 Yorkshire County Cup Final during the 1970–71 season at Odsal Stadium, Bradford on Saturday 21 November 1970, and played left-, and was captain in York's 8-18 defeat by Bradford Northern in the 1978 Yorkshire County Cup Final during the 1978–79 season at Headingley Rugby Stadium, Leeds on Saturday 28 October 1978, this was York's first major final since the 1936–37 Yorkshire County Cup Final, a period of 39-years, 2017 marked 39-years since the 1978 Yorkshire County Cup Final, meaning this was York's only major final in the last 78-years.

Notable tour matches
Alan Rhodes played in York's 2-29 defeat by Australia at Clarence Street, York on Tuesday 14 November 1978, under temporary floodlights.

References

External links

Search for "Rhodes" at rugbyleagueproject.org
April 2012
Vince Farrar February 1981 to ...

1947 births
Living people
Castleford Tigers players
Doncaster R.L.F.C. coaches
Doncaster R.L.F.C. players
English rugby league coaches
English rugby league players
Featherstone Rovers players
Place of birth missing (living people)
Rugby league props
Rugby league second-rows
Sheffield Eagles (1984) coaches
Sheffield Eagles (1984) players
York Wasps captains
York Wasps players